Thandaunggyi Township is a township of Hpa-an District in the Kayin State of Myanmar. The principal town is Thandanggyi.

Towns 
The township contains the following towns:
Thandaung Gyi
Thandaung
Leiktho
Bawgali

References 

Townships of Kayin State